Giovanni Antonio Scaramuccia (1580–1633) was an Italian painter, active mainly in Rome and Perugia.

Biography
He initially trained as a sculptor, and was enrolled as a member of the Collegio di Pietra e Legname (the guild of stonemasons and woodworkers) in 1614. He is described as a pupil of Cristoforo Roncalli in Rome. Among his pupils were his son, Luigi Pellegrini Scaramuccia,  Giovanni Domenico Cerrini and Paolo Gismondi.

He painted a series of panels depicting subjects of the New Testament for the Oratory of San Francesco in Perugia. He painted a mannerist Virgin and St Augustine (1625) for the Oratory of St Augustine in Perugia.

References

1580 births
1633 deaths
16th-century Italian painters
Italian male painters
17th-century Italian painters
Mannerist painters